Being John Malkovich is a 1999 American surrealist fantasy comedy film directed by Spike Jonze and written by Charlie Kaufman, both making their feature film debut. The film stars John Cusack, Cameron Diaz, and Catherine Keener, with John Malkovich as a satirical version of himself. Cusack plays a puppeteer who finds a portal that leads into Malkovich's mind.

Released by USA Films, the film received widespread acclaim for its writing and direction and was nominated in three categories at the 72nd Academy Awards: Best Director, Best Original Screenplay, and Best Supporting Actress for Keener.

Plot 

Craig Schwartz is an unemployed puppeteer in New York City, in a forlorn marriage with his pet-obsessed wife, Lotte. He finds work as a file clerk for the eccentric Dr. Lester in the Mertin-Flemmer building, on a floor between the 7th and 8th, where the ceiling is very low. He develops an attraction to co-worker Maxine Lund, who does not return his affections. While filing, Craig discovers a small hidden door. He crawls through it into a tunnel and finds himself inside the mind of actor John Malkovich. After about 15 minutes, Craig is ejected, landing on the side of the New Jersey Turnpike. He tells Maxine about the door, and she realizes they can sell the experience for profit.

Lotte enters the portal and becomes obsessed, saying that the experience awakens her transgender identity. She and Craig visit Dr. Lester's home, where Lotte finds a room filled with Malkovich memorabilia. Maxine arranges a date with Malkovich while he is inhabited by Lotte, who becomes smitten with Maxine. She reciprocates, but only when Lotte is inside Malkovich; Maxine manipulates him into having sex with her while Lotte is in his mind. Craig, forsaken by both women, locks Lotte in a cage and forces her to set up another tryst with Maxine. He inhabits Malkovich instead and discovers that his puppeteering skills allow him some control over him.

Disturbed by his loss of control, Malkovich confides in his friend Charlie Sheen and becomes suspicious of Maxine. He follows her to the office, where she and Craig charge customers to use the portal. Entering it, Malkovich finds himself in a world where everyone looks like him and says only "Malkovich." After he is ejected, he demands that Craig close the portal, but Craig refuses. Lotte is freed by her pet chimpanzee and warns Maxine that Craig is inhabiting Malkovich, but Maxine is attracted to Craig's ability to control him.

Lotte confronts Dr. Lester, who reveals that he is, in fact, Captain Mertin; having discovered the portal to a "vessel body" in the late 1800s, he erected the Mertin-Flemmer building to conceal it. He has obtained immortality by moving from one body to the next, which becomes "ripe" on the host's 44th birthday, allowing him to take possession. If he enters the portal past midnight on that day, he will instead be trapped in the next newborn vessel, helpless inside the new host's mind. Lester and a group of friends plan to occupy Malkovich once he turns 44, and Lotte warns them that Craig has taken control.

Craig discovers he can occupy Malkovich indefinitely. Inhabiting him over the next eight months, he makes Malkovich into a world-class puppeteer and marries Maxine, who becomes pregnant. On Malkovich's 44th birthday, Lester and Lotte kidnap Maxine. They call to demand that Craig leave Malkovich, threatening to kill Maxine, but he hangs up. In desperation, Lotte attempts to shoot Maxine, who escapes into the portal. Lotte pursues her through Malkovich's subconscious before they are both ejected. Maxine confesses that she kept her unborn child because it was conceived while Lotte was in Malkovich's mind, and the women cement their love for each other.

Craig, believing Maxine is still in danger, leaves Malkovich's mind, allowing Lester and his friends to enter. Discovering that Maxine has discarded him for Lotte, Craig swears to reenter the portal to take back Malkovich's mind. Seven years later, an elderly Malkovich, now a system, tells Sheen about their plan to extend their lives via the portal, which now leads to the mind of Emily, Maxine's daughter. Craig, who entered the portal too late, is permanently trapped inside Emily, forced to watch Lotte and Maxine live happily together.

Cast 

Spike Jonze makes a cameo appearance as Derek Mantini's assistant; Mantini is billed in the story as the greatest puppeteer in the history of the world and arouses Craig's envy. Brad Pitt also has a half-second-long cameo, as a miffed star in the documentary on Malkovich's career, who seems to be on the verge of saying something before the shot ends. Sean Penn appears as himself, a fan of Malkovich's puppeteer work. Film director David Fincher makes an uncredited appearance as Christopher Bing in the American Arts & Culture pseudo-documentary on John Malkovich. Winona Ryder, Andy Dick, and the members of Hanson can be seen in the audience of a Malkovich puppet show.

Production

Development 
Kaufman's idea of Being John Malkovich originated simply as "a story about a man who falls in love with someone who is not his wife." Gradually he added further elements to the story which he found entertaining, such as floor  of the Mertin Flemmer building; among his first ideas, Malkovich was "nowhere to be seen". He wrote the script on spec in 1994 and though it was widely read by production company and film studio executives, all turned it down. Hoping to find a producer, Kaufman sent the script to Francis Ford Coppola, who passed it on to his daughter's then boyfriend Spike Jonze.

Jonze first read the script in 1996 and had agreed to direct the film by 1997. Jonze took the script to Propaganda Films, which agreed to produce the film in partnership with production company Single Cell Pictures. Single Cell producers Michael Stipe and Sandy Stern pitched the film to numerous studios, including New Line Cinema, who dropped the project after chairman Robert Shaye asked: "Why the fuck can't it be Being Tom Cruise?". Jonze recalled that Malkovich asked the same question, and that Malkovich had felt that "Either the movie's a bomb and it's got not only my name above the title but my name in the title, so I'm fucked that way; or it does well and I'm just forever associated with this character." Jonze explained in the same interview that he had not realized how brave Malkovich's performance was.

With a budget of $10 million, principal photography of Being John Malkovich began on July 20, 1998, and continued through August. Filming took place primarily in Los Angeles; specific locations included the University of Southern California campus and the Observation Bar on board the RMS Queen Mary.

The puppets were created by Kamela Portuges-Robbins and Images in Motion. Phillip Huber animated the puppets. About Huber's puppetry, Jonze has said he was a full-time puppeteer and controlled his puppets with impressive means, such as using strings and no rods to control them, as well as swinging the puppets on high wires.

Casting
Diaz's make-up artist Gucci Westman described styling Diaz in the role as "a challenge, to make her look homely." The script included minimal physical descriptions of characters, and thus when Diaz took up the role she did not know that "people weren't going to recognize me."

Cusack read the film's script after he had asked his agent to present him with the "craziest, most unproduceable script you can find." Impressed with the script, he asked his agent to follow its progress and book him an audition, which won him the role.

Keener cited Being John Malkovich as an instance of her taking up a role based on the director's previous work. She had heard about Jonze's experience with music videos and took up the part of Maxine although she initially disliked the character and did not feel that she was right for the part. She was subsequently nominated for an Oscar.

Kaufman said that there was never another actor in Malkovich's place in the script: "The screenplay was always "Being John Malkovich", even before I had any expectation that John Malkovich would even read the script." He chose Malkovich because he believed there to be "an enigmatic quality about him that works", though Malkovich was partly chosen because of the sound of his name in repetition. Kaufman explained that "When we were thinking of alternatives, we found that a lot of them weren't fun to say." Jonze's then-father-in-law Francis Ford Coppola was able to contact Malkovich, and Jonze flew with producer Sandy Stern to Malkovich's home in France. Stern said that Malkovich was "half intrigued and half horrified" when he first read the script, but he eventually agreed to star in the film.

Distribution

Theatrical release 
Being John Malkovich was given limited release in the United States theatres on October 22, 1999 and opened across 25 screens. On its opening weekend, the film grossed US$637,731 across 25 screens with a per-screen average of $25,495. It expanded to another 150 screens the following week, bringing in $1.9 million with a per-screen average of $10,857. In its third week, the film's release widened to 467 locations and grossed $2.4 million, averaging a lower $5,041 per screen with a cumulative gross of $6.1 million. It moved into a wide release the next week, expanding to 591 screens, and grossed $1.9 million with a 20% drop in ticket sales. Its fifth week brought in $2.2 million with a 17% increase in ticket sales, which dropped a further 33% the following week despite further expansion to 624 screens. It finished its theatrical run after 26 weeks with a total gross of $22,863,596.

The film opened in the United Kingdom in March 2000, earning £296,282 in its debut week and closing after fifteen weeks with a total gross of £1,098,927. In France, the film opened in December 1999 with a gross of US$546,000 from 94 venues and went on to further success due to positive reviews and word of mouth. It grossed $205,100 from 109 screens on its opening weekend in Italy and ticket sales dropped by 37% the following week with a cumulative gross of $480,000 from 82 screens. Its German release brought in a total of $243,071. Being John Malkovich had a total foreign gross of $9,523,455, combined with its domestic gross to give an international total of over $32 million.

Home media 
Being John Malkovich was initially released in 2000 on VHS, both as a regular edition and a limited edition collector's set, and on DVD, with special features including a theatrical trailer, TV spots, cast and crew biographies, the director's photo album and featurettes on floor 7½ and puppeteering. A special edition DVD, released later the same year, included the aforementioned features, an interview with Jonze and two behind-the-scenes featurettes. It was released on HD DVD in 2008. The Criterion Collection released a special edition of the film on Blu-ray and DVD in 2012.

Soundtrack

Reception

Critical response 
On Rotten Tomatoes, the film holds an approval rating of 94% based on 136 reviews, with an average rating of 8.2/10. The site's critical consensus reads: "Smart, funny, and highly original, Being John Malkovich supports its wild premise with skillful direction and a stellar ensemble cast." On Metacritic, the film has a weighted average score of 90 out of 100 based on 36 critics reviews, indicating "universal acclaim". Audiences polled by CinemaScore gave the film an average grade of "C" on an A+ to F scale.

The film ranked 441st on Empire magazine's 2008 list of the 500 greatest films of all time. In his review, Roger Ebert awarded the film a full four stars; he would later name it the best film of 1999. His comments of praise included: "Rare is the movie where the last half hour surprises you just as much as the first, and in ways you're not expecting. The movie has ideas enough for half a dozen films, but Jonze and his cast handle them so surely that we never feel hard-pressed; we're enchanted by one development after the next" and he also felt that "Either Being John Malkovich gets nominated for best picture, or the members of the Academy need portals into their brains." Another top critic Peter Rainer, writing for New York, commented that "dazzlingly singular movies aren't often this much fun" in his review, and Owen Gleiberman, writing for Entertainment Weekly, called it "the most excitingly original movie of the year."

Malkovich's performance in Being John Malkovich is ranked number 90 on Premiere's "100 Greatest Movie Characters of All Time".

Accolades

References

External links 

 
 
 
 
 

1999 films
1990s fantasy comedy-drama films
1999 independent films
1999 LGBT-related films
American fantasy comedy-drama films
American independent films
American LGBT-related films
BAFTA winners (films)
1990s English-language films
Cultural depictions of actors
Self-reflexive films
Metaphysical fiction films
Films about actors
Films directed by Spike Jonze
Puppet films
Films set in New Jersey
Films set in New York City
Films shot from the first-person perspective
Films shot in New Jersey
Lesbian-related films
Marionette films
Michael Stipe
Fiction about mind control
Films with screenplays by Charlie Kaufman
Films whose writer won the Best Original Screenplay BAFTA Award
Films scored by Carter Burwell
Transgender-related films
Films produced by Steve Golin
Gramercy Pictures films
1999 directorial debut films
Magic realism films
National Society of Film Critics Award for Best Film winners
USA Films films
Universal Pictures films
1990s American films